Federation X  or "FED X" is an American rock band, originally formed in Bellingham, Washington, founded by Ben Wildenhaus (guitar), Bill Badgley (guitar, vocals), and Beau Boyd (drums) in 1998.

Career
In 1999, the band released a self-titled LP on its own Molasses Manifesto Records, then followed it in 2001 with American Folk Horror, recorded by Tim Green at Louder Studios in San Francisco and released by Bellingham's Estrus Records. In 2003, Estrus released X Patriot, recorded by Steve Albini at Electrical Audio in Chicago. In 2005, Estrus released Rally Day, recorded by Ryan Anderson at MARS Studio in Bellingham. Wantage USA released Rally Day on vinyl. In 2006, Josh Holland of Dog Shredder joined the band for a West Coast tour and at a recording session at MARS Studio, which produced the songs "Only Fool" and "Chinese Food and Vietnam," released as a 7-inch on Recess Records in 2012. In March 2013, Federation X recorded its fifth studio album with Deaf Nephews recording and producing at Entourage Studios in Los Angeles. Entitled We Do What We Must, it was released in 2013 on Recess Records and the band's own Molasses Manifesto.

Wildenhaus performs solo under the name Ben von Wildenhaus' while Boyd has a side project called Zorbatron. Badgley, under the name William E. Badgley, owns and operates Molasses Manifesto, a company that produces films, books, music, and art and is responsible for the film Kill All Redneck Pricks: A Documentary Film about a Band Called KARP. Badgley also owns and operates The Documentary Center  in Bellingham, Washington, and performs with the electronic band Part Wolf.

Discography

Albums
Fighting Words (1998) Cassette-Only, Molasses Manifesto
Federation X (1999)
American Folk Horror (2001)
Z Montany +2, Tour-Only CD, Self-Released with Irritant Records
X Patriot (2003)
Rally Day (2005)
 We Do What We Must (2013)

Singles
"Only Fool" / "Chinese Food and Vietnam" (2013)

References

External links
 Estrus Records
 Federation X article by Graham Isaac
 Portlandmercury.com

Rock music groups from Washington (state)
Musical groups established in 1998